Paolo Montuschi is a professor at the Polytechnic University of Turin, Italy. He was awarded Fellow of the Institute of Electrical and Electronics Engineers (IEEE) in 2014 for his contributions to the theory and applications of digital arithmetic.

References

Fellow Members of the IEEE
Living people
Engineers from Turin
Year of birth missing (living people)
Academic staff of the Polytechnic University of Turin
Place of birth missing (living people)